Thankam is a 2023 Indian Malayalam-language crime film directed by Saheed Arafath and written by Syam Pushkaran. It stars Biju Menon, Vineeth Sreenivasan and Aparna Balamurali in lead roles. The film is produced by Bhavana Studios in association with Working Class Hero and Fahadh Faasil and Friends. The film is based on an incident that happened to a jeweller in Thrissur.

Thankam was released theatrically on 26 January 2023 and received positive reviews from critics.

Plot 
From Thrissur, the Gold Capital of India, Muthu and Kannan are gold brokers. The movie depicts their voyage to Mumbai to distribute gold as well as the subsequent setbacks they encounter.

On one of the trips, Kannan disappears and is later discovered dead in a hotel room. The cops contact his wife to ask her to verify his identity. The police report that the door was closed from the outside using a different lock and that Kannan was discovered hanging from the fan with a pool of blood on the floor. He had several wounds on his body, which suggests that he was more likely murdered, according to the results of the postmortem. The 8kgs of gold supposed to be with Kannan, is found to be missing.

Muthu and his colleagues enlist the help of Inspector Vijay from Chembur Police Station to conduct inquiry into Kannan's death.

As the inquiry goes on, it is revealed that Kannan planned his own murder with the assistance of his two other friends, Arul and Abbas, unable to get out of the debt he was in at the time. He told of his murder plan to Arul only, and Abbas was told to create disarray in Kannan's hotel room, inflict wounds on Kannan's body, take the 2kg gold Kannan possessed, and leave Kannan tied up in the room locking the door from outside. After Abbas left, Kannan untied himself and hung himself from the ceiling fan. Kannan did not have in possession 8kgs of gold as he tried to present to Muthu and everyone else. He had only 2kgs and gave it to Abbas to execute his plan. He tried to disguise his suicide as a murder in the hope that the persons in gold business whom Kannan owed money to, would pardon his family as well as his partner Muthu if Kannan was murdered rather than dead by suicide.

Arul tells Kannan's wife Keerthy that Kannan had entrusted him to tell her he tried his best and this was the only way out he found, and hands over to her a gold locket always worn by Kannan, as a memoir.

Muthu tries hard to digest the discovery that his friend hid such pain from him and decided to end his life, and speaks about trying to have the case concluded as murder and not suicide, partly due to his disbelief and partly to protect himself and Kannan's family from Kannan's creditors, the reason for which Kannan orchestrated his death. Keerthy, disillusioned by the turn of events, deposits Kannan's gold locket in a temple's hundial. All of them return to Thrissur from Mumbai battling various internal struggles.

Cast

Production

Development 
In October 2019, Thankam was announced as the second production venture of Working Class Hero with the cast of Fahadh Faasil, Joju George, Aparna Balamurali and Dileesh Pothan in lead roles. The film was expected to hit screens by early 2020. But due to COVID-19, the production got delayed.

Filming 
Principal photography commenced on 29 May 2022, with the updated cast of Biju Menon and Vineeth Sreenivasan in the lead roles. The first look of the film was released on 10 December 2022 hinting that the film would hit screens sometime in 2023. Filming was completed on 2 September 2022.

Music 

The music of the film is composed by Bijibal. The first single titled "Devi Neeye" was released on 13 January 2023.

Release 
Thankam was released in theatres on 26 January 2023, clashing with Mohanlal's Alone. The film marks the last film acted by Kochu Preman. The film was released as a tribute to the veteran actor.

Reception 
Thankam received positive reviews from critics.

S.R. Praveen of The Hindu praised the film and wrote "Director Saheed Arafath and scriptwriter Syam Pushkaran masterfully handle the journey of the narrative, led by fine performances from Vineeth Sreenivasan, Biju Menon and others in the cast."

Kirubhakar Purushothaman of The Indian Express gave the film 4.5 out of 5 and wrote "Thankam is a character study of everyday people. It is mostly about Kannan and the length he goes to come across as someone he is not. It’s about the facade humans wear to not show what they really are inside. One can argue that the big reveal doesn’t justify all the build-up of the film, but that is just reflective of Kannan’s life. He is not what we wanted him to be. He didn’t pull an elephant out of the hat. He didn’t surprise us the way we expected him to, because we didn’t see through him. That’s the biggest twist of Thankam."

Latha Srinivasan of India Today gave 3.5 out of 5 and wrote "Syam Pushkaran’s script, Saheed Arafath’s direction and performances make it a much-watch. As an investigative drama, Thankam is one of the best films that have come out in recent times."

Sajin Shrijith of The New Indian Express gave 3.5 out of 5 and wrote "While Thankam is not as dark as Syam’s Joji, I’m not sure it has the latter’s replay value. If anything, it is, like Joji, another testament to the fact that Syam can also venture into considerably grim territories."

See also 
List of Malayalam films of 2023

References

External links 

2023 films
2023 crime drama films
Indian crime drama films
2020s Malayalam-language films
2023 directorial debut films
Films with screenplays by Syam Pushkaran
Films scored by Bijibal
Films shot in Mumbai
Films shot in Thrissur